The Maunesha River is a  tributary of the Crawfish River in south-central Wisconsin in the United States.  Via the Crawfish and Rock rivers, it is part of the Mississippi River watershed.

Course

The Maunesha is formed in the town of Bristol in Dane County from a collection of headwaters tributaries flowing from Columbia County.  It flows generally eastward through northeastern Dane County (past the village of Marshall), northwestern Jefferson County (past the city of Waterloo) and southwestern Dodge County, where it joins the Crawfish River in the town of Portland.

An excellent public area to view this narrow fast-flowing river is in Waterloo at Fireman's Park.

Photo gallery

Gallery of 2008 flood in Waterloo, Wisconsin

See also
List of Wisconsin rivers

References

Rivers of Wisconsin
Rivers of Dane County, Wisconsin
Rivers of Dodge County, Wisconsin
Rivers of Jefferson County, Wisconsin
Tributaries of the Mississippi River